Irish Songs the Slim Whitman Way is a studio album by Slim Whitman, released in 1963 on Imperial Records.

Track listing 
The album was issued in the United States and Canada by Imperial Records as a 12-inch long-playing record, catalog numbers LP 9245 (mono) and 12245 (stereo).

References 

1963 albums
Slim Whitman albums
Imperial Records albums